Dixiana may refer to:

Dixiana (band), an American country music band, or their self-titled debut album
Dixiana (film), a 1930 American film
Dixiana (train), a type of railroad passenger train
Dixiana, Alabama, an unincorporated community in Jefferson County, Alabama, United States
Dixiana, Virginia, a town in Virginia, United States
Dixiana, South Carolina, a small rural community located southwest of Columbia, South Carolina, in Lexington County
Dixiana Farm, historic horse breeding farm, Lexington, Kentucky.